Benimakia lanceolata is a species of sea snail, a marine gastropod mollusc in the family Fasciolariidae, the spindle snails, the tulip snails and their allies.

Description

Distribution
This marine species occurs off Papua New Guinea.

References

 Bouchet P. & Snyder M.A. (2013) New and old species of Benimakia (Neogastropoda: Fasciolariidae) and a description of Nodolatirus, new genus. Journal of Conchology 41(3): 331-341

External links
 Reeve, L. A. (1847). Monograph of the genus Turbinella. In: Conchologia Iconica, or, illustrations of the shells of molluscous animals, vol. 4, pl. 1-13 and unpaginated text. L. Reeve & Co., London

Fasciolariidae
Gastropods described in 1847